Gary J. LaPaille (March 14, 1954 – December 1, 2022) was an American politician and businessman.

Born in Chicago, Illinois, LaPaille graduated from Loyola University Chicago with a degree in business. LaPaille was chairman of the Illinois Democratic Party 1990–1998. In 1990, Crain's Chicago Business named him as one of their 40 Under 40 individuals who were prominent in business and/or government. He served as a Democratic member of the Illinois State Senate 1993–1994. During his time in the Senate, he was the minority spokesman on the Local Government & Elections Committee. His other committee assignments included The Committee on Agriculture & Conservation and the Committee on Financial Institutions. He was also the Managing Director of Chestnut Hill Partners; an executive search firm.

LaPaille was president of mCapitol Management, Inc, a business and political consulting business. LaPaille died from complications of amyotrophic lateral sclerosis December 1, 2022, at the age of 68.

Notes

External links

1954 births
2022 deaths
Businesspeople from Chicago
Loyola University Chicago alumni
Illinois Democratic Party chairs
Democratic Party Illinois state senators
Deaths from motor neuron disease
Neurological disease deaths in Maryland
People from Potomac, Maryland